Jesús Manuel 'Suso' Santana Abreu (born 2 March 1985) is a Spanish former footballer who played as a right winger.

He started his professional career with Tenerife, but was loaned several times to lower league teams until the end of his contract. In 2009, he moved to the Scottish Premier League with Hearts, where he remained three years.

In 2012, Santana returned to Tenerife. Over nine seasons in Segunda División with the club, he amassed totals of 288 matches and 33 goals.

Club career

Tenerife
Born in San Cristóbal de La Laguna, Province of Santa Cruz de Tenerife, Santana began his professional career at local CD Tenerife, signing in 2002 with its youth system. Early on, he was loaned to Tercera División sides Atlético Arona CF and AD Laguna, in order to gain experience.

Santana played one full season with Tenerife in Segunda División, but opportunities continued to be limited for him in the main squad and another two loan spells ensued, now with Segunda División B teams CD San Isidro and UD Fuerteventura. With the former, he finished as top scorer in the 2008–09 campaign with nine goals from the right side of midfield, although they would be relegated due to financial problems.

Hearts
Santana's performances caught the eye of Hearts manager Csaba László, who signed him on a free transfer from Tenerife on 30 June 2009. He got off to a good start at Tynecastle Stadium, playing in every pre-season game and particularly impressing in friendlies against Bolton Wanderers (where he set up the only goal) and Sunderland, putting in player of the match performances.

However, in the Scottish Premier League, Santana's displays were somewhat erratic: during a 2–2 draw with St Johnstone, he was replaced after an alleged spitting incident. He improved from there onwards, again being named man of the match in the side's 1–0 win over Kilmarnock on 15 September 2009. He scored his first goal for the club five days later, opening a 2–1 defeat against Celtic at Celtic Park with a long-range shot.

Santana's second goal for Hearts came on 26 September 2009, the second in a 2–1 victory over Hamilton Academical. He also netted against eventual champions Rangers in a 1–4 home loss, from a volley.

Santana's second season in Scotland was hit by injuries, and he never really managed to get a consistent run together, also having to undergo knee surgery in late April 2011. After returning to full fitness, he began appearing as a substitute. On 18 March 2012 he scored his second goal of the campaign, netting in the 90th minute of a 2–0 derby defeat of Hibernian. He also helped the team win the season's Scottish Cup, but left in early July.

Return to Tenerife
Santana returned to his native Canary Islands and Tenerife on 6 July 2012. He scored five goals in his first season in his second stint, helping the club return to the second tier after one year out.

Santana featured regularly for Tete in the following campaigns while acting as team captain, only losing his first-choice status in 2019–20. On 8 June 2021, aged 36 and having made 337 competitive appearances, he retired from professional football.

Club statistics

References

External links

1985 births
Living people
People from San Cristóbal de La Laguna
Sportspeople from the Province of Santa Cruz de Tenerife
Spanish footballers
Footballers from the Canary Islands
Association football wingers
Segunda División players
Segunda División B players
Tercera División players
CD Tenerife players
Scottish Premier League players
Heart of Midlothian F.C. players
Spanish expatriate footballers
Expatriate footballers in Scotland
Spanish expatriate sportspeople in Scotland